Halochlorococcum is a genus of green algae, in the family Oltmannsiellopsidaceae.

References

External links

Ulvophyceae genera
Oltmannsiellopsidales